The EMD SW7 was a diesel switcher locomotive built by General Motors Electro-Motive Division between October 1949 and January 1951. It was powered by a 12-567A engine. The SW7 replaced the earlier 1,000 horsepower NW2 switcher in EMD's catalog. A total of 489 SW7 locomotives were produced. The majority of the SW7s were built by EMD Plant #3 in Cleveland, Ohio. In addition, 15 TR4 cow-calf paired sets were produced.

SW7 production was discontinued in 1951 in favor of the new SW9.

Original buyers

External links

See also 
 List of GM-EMD locomotives

References 

 * Kristopans, Andre J. http://utahrails.net/ajkristopans/SWITCHERS201Aand567.php Retrieved October 7, 2014.This is a compilation of EMD Product Reference Data
 General Motors Electro-Motive Division Service Department "Locomotive Reference Data" published January 1, 1959, 286 pages.
 

B-B locomotives
SW0007
Diesel-electric locomotives of the United States
Railway locomotives introduced in 1949
Locomotives with cabless variants
Standard gauge locomotives of the United States

Shunting locomotives